Vernon Van Duke Duncan (January 6, 1890 – June 1, 1954) was a Major League Baseball outfielder. He began his major league career late in the  season with the Philadelphia Phillies, then jumped to the new Federal League during the offseason. He spent the next two seasons as a starting outfielder for the Baltimore Terrapins, playing mostly as a center fielder. Although he continued to play professionally in the minor leagues until , Duncan never played in the majors again.

Sources

1890 births
1954 deaths
Major League Baseball outfielders
Philadelphia Phillies players
Baltimore Terrapins players
Columbia Gamecocks players
Columbia Commies players
Dallas Giants players
Raleigh Capitals players
St. Paul Saints (AA) players
Greensboro Patriots players
North Carolina Tar Heels baseball coaches
People from Clayton, North Carolina
Baseball players from North Carolina